The Shaarei Ha’esh Battalion, also  Unit 9300, is a reserve battalion of the Israel Defense Forces.

History
The unit is part of the regional Baram Brigade. Personnel of the Unit 9300 consists of reservists freshly released from the reconnaissance battalion of the Golani Brigade.

According Colonel Roi Levi, commander of the Baram Brigade, the battalion serves the purpose of defending communities near the Israeli-Lebanon border and provide attack resources against Hezbollah.

See also 
 Reserve duty (Israel)

References

Battalions of Israel
Military units and formations established in 2018
2018 establishments in Israel